Silverline Movie Channel is a German-language pay-TV station which broadcasts feature films from the areas of action, horror, martial arts, science fiction and Z movies. The station was founded by the Silverline Television AG, based in Grünwald (near Munich). The channel is availvable on cable and IPTV network in German-speaking Europe.

A variant of the channel for Eastern Europe and other international markets is also planned, for which a second playout will be built. Negotiations with platform operators are ongoing. Programmes will be shown in English with subtitles.

Programming
The channel exclusively shows feature films of the genres action, horror, martial arts and science fiction. There are no making-of's and no advertising. The films are faded.

The Silverline Movie Channel collaborates with filmmakers from all over the world. The majority of films come from the USA and Asia. The program also includes films from Europe and Latin America.

Broadcasting
The Silverline Movie Channel is available on Kabel Deutschland, Kabelkiosk, Unitymedia, Swisscable, Magine TV and Telekom Entertain.

References

External links
 

Television channels and stations established in 2003
2003 establishments in Germany
Television stations in Germany
Television stations in Austria
Television stations in Switzerland
German-language television stations
Mass media in Munich